Die Lottosieger (English: Lottery Winners) is an Austrian comedy television series. It was produced from 2008 to 2011 and broadcast from 2009 to 2012 on ORF 1. Die Lottosieger is about a family that becomes rich by winning the lottery.

Cast
Reinhard Nowak as Rudolf "Rudi" Deschek
Theresia Haiger as Claudia Deschek-Beck
Brigitte Neumeister as Kriemhild Deschek (Rudi's mother)
David Heissig as Romeo Deschek (Claudia and Rudi's son)
Hilde Dalik as Elfi Beck (Claudia's sister)
Alexander Pschill as Dr. Rüdiger Rössler (psychologist, employed by the lottery to assist lottery millionaires)

Episodes

See also
List of Austrian television series

References

External links
 

Austrian television series
ORF (broadcaster) original programming
Austrian comedy television series
2000s Austrian television series
2010s Austrian television series
2009 Austrian television series debuts
2012 Austrian television series endings
German-language television shows